Canada's Worst Driver 10 was the tenth season of the Canadian reality TV show Canada's Worst Driver, which aired on the Discovery Channel. As with previous years, eight people, nominated by their family or friends, enter the Driver Rehabilitation Centre to improve their driving skills. This year, the Driver Rehabilitation Centre is located at the Dunnville Airport in Dunnville, Ontario for the fifth straight season. The initial drive started in Niagara Falls, Ontario and the final road test occurred in Hamilton, Ontario.

Experts
 Cam Woolley is the show's longest-serving expert, having been present in every season except the first and has seen the habits of Canadian drivers change drastically since 2000, with the most common offense having changed from DUI to distracted driving. He is the traffic expert on CP24 in Toronto and had a 25-year career as a traffic sergeant with the Ontario Provincial Police.
 Philippe Létourneau is a veteran high-speed driving instructor who counts BMW and Ferrari among his clients. Since joining the show in the third season, the average car has gained considerably in speed and acceleration, with the high-speed emphasis of this season making his job a particularly important one.
 Shyamala Kiru is the show's resident psychotherapist and relationship expert, a position which has become more demanding each year since joining the show in the seventh season, as the stresses in driving and everyday life seem to always be on the increase. With Shyamala returning for her fourth season (breaking a tie with Dr. Louisa Gembora), that officially makes her the longest-tenured psychologist in Canada's Worst Driver history.
 Tim Danter is the show's head driving instructor, a position he has held since joining the show in the eighth season. In this position, he not only gives the drivers help and instructions for challenges, but gives them further lessons off-screen. With Tim returning for his third season, that ties him with his predecessor, Peter Mellor (the head instructor from seasons five-seven of Canada's Worst Driver) and Scott Marshall (the head instructor from seasons one-three of Canada's Worst Driver) as the longest-tenured head instructor so far.

Contestants
 Ian Brannan, 33, from Kingston, Ontario, is renowned as the worst taxi driver ever, having written off two cars and caused six accidents during just a year. His habit of blaming other drivers and unwillingness to admit to his own faults has resulted in his buddy, Adam, bringing him to rehab, in an attempt to prevent Ian from becoming "Canada's Worst Taxi Driver." He drives a silver Chevrolet Impala and drove a silver Chrysler Sebring to the rehab centre. 
 Mariah Carriere, 22, from Port Colborne, Ontario, was a habitual drunk driver whose preferred method of dealing with her anxiety over driving is to ignore any and all driving laws. This carefree attitude has led to a $7,000 insurance bill and even resulted in her rear-ending a police car while texting at the wheel. Her best friend, Jessica, has nominated Mariah in an effort to finally get her under control. She drives a black Pontiac G5.
 George Firth, 36, from St. Catharines, Ontario, is prone to road rage, enjoys racing other drivers and often spends more time watching TV shows on his smartphone than paying attention to the road. These dangerous habits have caused his best friend, Patrik, to nominate him for rehab. He drives a black Ford F-150.
 Tyler Fitzsimmons, 27, from Notre-Dame-de-l'Île-Perrot, Quebec (near Montreal), is a self-described old man trapped inside a young man's body. His buddy, John "Q" Quart, has nominated him for his extremely over-cautious driving style, something that, oddly enough, does not carry through to Tyler's day job as a light aircraft pilot. Tyler drives a blue Toyota Tercel.
 Jason Marcoux, 45, from Sudbury, Ontario, has a car that is literally held together with duct tape as a result of dozens of accidents caused by apparent issues with vision and spatial awareness, which have resulted in him being pulled over for drunk-driving despite being a teetotaler. His brother, Bart Marcoux, believes that Jason should give up driving, and has brought him to rehab in a last-ditch effort to get to the bottom of Jason's problems. He drives a beige Chevrolet Cavalier and drove an orange Pontiac Wave to the rehab centre.
 Siham Martell, 27, from Calgary, Alberta (originally from Morocco), was a new driver in Halifax, Nova Scotia where her newly found independence was shattered after she was involved in a four-car pile-up in 2010. Now she struggles to keep her composure and her driving skills while at the wheel. Originally nominated by her husband, Wayne Martell, for Canada's Worst Driver 8, she turned down the opportunity, but got nominated again this year in hopes that rehab will restore her confidence in herself. Siham drives a black Volkswagen Tiguan and drove a black Ford Escape to the rehab centre.
 Santana Pike, 22 and licensed for four years, from Port Aux Basques, Newfoundland (near Corner Brook), is a self-taught and perpetually distracted driver who estimates that she has had between 200 and 300 minor accidents since getting her license in 2010. Her carefree attitude has resulted in her best friend, Jim-Bob Kane, nominating her as the nation's worst driver. She drives a red Chevrolet Cobalt and drove a red Chevrolet Aveo to the rehab centre.
 Chanie Richard, 27 and licensed for nine years, from Calgary, Alberta, is a surface land administrator and mother of one who obtained her Prince Edward Island driving license through "beginner's luck" at the first time of asking and only the second time she had driven overall. Since moving to the big city from the Maritimes, her lack of driving skill has become glaringly obvious to the point that her boyfriend, Jeremy King, has brought her to rehab to gain the driving education she never had. She drives a red GMC Sierra and drove a blue Toyota Yaris to the rehab centre.

Synopsis

 The contestant became Canada's Worst Driver.
 The contestant was runner-up for Canada's Worst Driver.
 The contestant was on the panel's shortlist.
 The contestant was under consideration to be expelled from the Driver's Rehabilitation Centre.
 The contestant graduated.

Episode 1: Welcome to Rehab...
Original Airdate: October 27, 2014
 The Drive to Rehab: For the second time in three seasons, the journey to the Driver Rehabilitation Centre starts from Niagara Falls, this time from Maxximum Motors, a used car lot on Bridge Street (it has since been replaced with Victory Automobile International), with the eight drivers heading to rehab using a provided set of instructions, a journey that Andrew notes would take most drivers like himself 90 minutes. Chanie is the first to set off, though Andrew is concerned when she admits that she does her make-up and takes 15-20 selfies while at the wheel and flabbergasted when she reveals that she isn't quite sure how to turn the car around. During the drive to rehab, she repeatedly runs red lights and illegally stops in a crosswalk (the same one, in fact, that Canada's Worst Driver 6 "runner-up" Dale Pitton turned left from and cut off a driver who had the right-of-way during her final road test). Jason sets off next and his poor eyesight causes him to not only run red lights, but miss vital landmarks and street signs; upon his arrival, Andrew tells him that they will be booking an eye test for him as soon as possible. Siham, who is next to leave, has to take anti-anxiety medication (which she indicates she usually does three times per day) before starting her drive, which goes without any major incidents or errors, though she's still incredibly nervous throughout; upon her arrival, she makes the same vow that Kevin Simmons did in the previous season-- by saying that should she be named the worst, she will destroy her driving license and give up driving permanently. Tyler has the opposite problem to most of the other drivers, proving so over-cautious that he frequently stops at green lights. Santana, on the other hand, frequently runs red lights and her admission of repeatedly hitting things in her hometown results in Andrew admitting that his fellow "Newfies" don't always know how to drive. Ian becomes the show's first driver to head to rehab in a taxi and during the drive, Adam calls him out for using excuses to dodge responsibility for his errors, though his drive otherwise goes without incident. Andrew is concerned about not only Mariah's lackadaisical attitude prior to her drive, but Jessica's as well; Mariah subsequently insists on holding onto the directions herself while driving, runs red lights and even drives the wrong way up a one-way street. George is the final driver to set out for rehab and during his journey, he drives well over the speed limit, texts while driving and deliberately tailgates other drivers; he arrives in the fastest time, but only because he disregarded the instructions and, like Sly Grosjean in the seventh season, used his smartphone's GPS, causing Andrew to state that, in the future, he needs to do what the show tells him to do.
First to Arrive: Chanie was the first to leave and the first to arrive.
Last to Arrive: Mariah was the last.
Slowest to Arrive: Even though Mariah was the last to arrive, Santana was the slowest, arriving at 3:14.
Fastest to Arrive: Even though Chanie was the first to arrive, George was the fastest, arriving at 1:29.
 Cadillac Challenge: Basic Assessment: This season's recurring challenge car is revealed to be a high-performance Cadillac CTS-V that the show purchased for $60,000. The basic skills test is identical to the one used in the previous season, with the drivers first having to reverse through a small course made up of wheel rims, then turn the car around in a space bordered by concrete blocks and finally drive a high-speed slalom. Santana is the first to take the challenge and her failure to adjust the mirrors (even after Jim-Bob reminds her to do so) results in her knocking down several rims, then badly denting and scraping the Cadillac while turning it around, before she takes the slalom and hits one of the four foam people. Tyler does even worse thanks to not using his mirrors at all, knocking down more rims than Santana, doing a similar amount of damage to the car while turning it around and then going too slow in the slalom and still hitting two of the foam people. Things get even worse in Mariah's run, as she performs near-identically to Tyler, actively refusing to use her mirrors despite both Andrew and Jessica reminding her to do so and getting extremely stressed out. George manages to break the trend, getting through the first two segments of the challenge without hitting a single thing; this causes Andrew to conclude that George's problem is with his attitude rather than a lack of skill, something demonstrated when he speeds in the slalom and hits the last foam person. Chanie hits the very first set of wheel rims and then hits so many more that she actually punctures one of the Cadillac's tires. After the tire is replaced, she hastily goes through the concrete section and actually hits the blocks hard enough to move them around, before cementing this as the worst run yet by hitting several foam people in the slalom despite driving at barely half the required speed; on closer inspection, it's revealed that she repeatedly hit the brake rather than the accelerator pedal in the slalom. Jason somehow manages to do even worse than Chanie (if that's even possible), knocking down nearly every set of wheel rims on the left-hand side of the initial section, then causing further damage to the Cadillac's body while turning it around and taking the slalom at half the required speed. Ian proves to be incredibly slow and still knocks down many wheel rims and then causes many dents and scrapes while turning around, before going too fast in the slalom and hitting two foam people; Andrew also points out that there are no formal requirements to becoming a taxi driver in Ontario other than a $150 additional license and, to further make his point, attaches a magnetic "Taxi" sign to the Cadillac's roof early in the run (which Ian doesn't even notice). Siham is the final driver to take the test and, in an effort to boost her confidence, Andrew asks her to take the first part of the test without Wayne in the car; she subsequently gets through the wheel rims without hitting a single thing, but when Wayne gets back in the car for the second part, she immediately starts relying on him to make all the decisions, resulting in her having serious problems turning the car around and then hitting two foam people during the slalom, convincing Andrew that Siham would be better driving alone.
Best Performer: George and Siham were the only two people to pass at least one segment of this challenge, with George doing slightly better.
Worst Performer: Chanie did the worst, hitting so many wheel rims, she punctures a tire, then hit the concrete blocks hard enough to move them around. Jason also did poorly in the wheel rim, but did slightly better in the slalom than Chanie.
After the initial test, the drivers have their first meeting with the experts. The experts reiterate to Jason the importance of taking an eye test as soon as possible and Andrew expresses disbelief at the fact that driving-related eye examinations are not mandatory until the age of 80. Mariah is also called out on her attitude toward her drunk-driving and Cam informs her that should she kill or injure someone while doing so, she would face near-certain jail time. Most of the drivers are convinced that they are not Canada's Worst Driver, though Jason, Chanie and Siham admit that they may be. As usual, no one graduates this episode, as it serves merely as a skills evaluation.

Episode 2: Crash, Bang, Boom!
Original Airdate: November 3, 2014
Riding the Rails: In a new variation on what was also the first real challenge of the previous season, the drivers each have to drive a Chevy Tracker up a pair of rails, staying on them at all times, then stopping in a marked zone at the end and then reversing back down them. Unlike the previous season, the rails are a continuous slope and do not level off and this throws Andrew off, nearly causing him to fail his demonstration. Jason takes the challenge first and almost falls off immediately after failing to adjust his mirrors. After being reminded to adjust them, he gets to the end of the rails without major trouble, but like Andrew, he drives too far; unlike Andrew, however, he's unable to rescue the situation and falls off the end, failing. Chanie demands that Jeremy do all the thinking for her and while the two are arguing, she drives straight off the end of the rails. Santana fails almost immediately by falling off the rails before she can even get the car fully on them. George's overconfidence and carelessness causes him to fall off about halfway up the track, causing Patrik to deliver on his promise of punching George whenever he fails. Mariah has the best performance so far, getting all the way up the track with no problem at all, but her inattention causes her to fall off when reversing. Tyler becomes another person who fails almost immediately, not even managing to get on the track correctly. Before his run, Ian presents Andrew with a list of his major issues as a driver, none of which appear to be directly relevant to how he actually drives; he subsequently gets all the way up the rails, but drifts so far to the right that he falls off the instant he begins reversing. Siham's confidence issues result in her being incredibly slow while taking the challenge (so slow in fact that Andrew has time to deliver copies of Ian's list to the experts, who question his suitability for rehab if his main issues are things that could easily be addressed without being on the show); she nonetheless becomes the only driver who passes, though it takes her over an hour to do so.
Best Performer: Siham, despite her slow pace, is the only driver to pass this challenge.
Worst Performer: Even though no one else passed, Santana and Tyler both failed the challenge almost immediately.
Head-to-Head Reversing: In this challenge, previously run in the eighth season, the drivers are split up into two Honda Civic coupes and have to reverse in a straight line down a short course, turn around in a small area at the bottom and then reverse back up the lane they started in. Santana and Siham are first-up and while Santana completes the course quickly and flawlessly (so much so that she even has time to complete a second, equally flawless run to prove her first successful run wasn't a fluke), Siham refuses to apply the advice to look where she wants to go and consequently is very slow and causes a lot of damage to the course. Jason and Tyler are second; Tyler gets down the starting lane without too much trouble, but his turns in the bottom part of the course are far too wide, resulting in him knocking down several of the wheel rims that are bordering the course, and this combined with the fact that he holds the steering wheel at the bottom rather than the top causes him to fail. Jason does even worse and experiences repeated collisions in both directions. Chanie and Mariah make up the third heat and both fail after experiencing several collisions in both directions, although Chanie is by far the worse of the two, taking more than twice as long as Mariah and causing the most damage to the course yet. George and Ian are the final pairing and while George passes with no trouble whatsoever, Ian (who again has a "Taxi" sign attached to the roof of his car) has the worst run of the day, veering wildly around the course and causing massive amounts of damage.
Best Performer: George and Santana both passed without a single hit.
Worst Performer: Even though everyone else failed, Ian was the worst, as he caused more hits than any other driver.
Cadillac Challenge: Eye of the Needle: For this, one of the show's most well-known challenges, each driver must drive the Cadillac at a constant 70 km/h, and navigate it through five arches which have been each staggered by the width of a highway lane. Santana is first-up and a combination of her being taken aback by the Cadillac's power and failing to look where she wants to go results in her hitting two of the first three arches and missing the last two entirely. Tyler does little better, failing to drive the required speed, clipping two of the arches and smashing the final one. Mariah drives far too fast, speeding up to 100 km/h, destroying the third arch and not being able to reach the fourth. Chanie smashes all but one of the arches due to driving too fast (at 90 km/h) and wearing cumbersome wedge shoes. George earns Andrew's ire by mocking the drivers who failed to complete this challenge in previous seasons; subsequently, he gets through the course without hitting anything, but his run is deemed a failure since he took the course at 85 km/h instead of the required 70 km/h. Jason's run is the worst so far, as he drives at 90 km/h and not only smashes three of the arches, but even destroys a camera placed by the side of the course; this, combined with his inability to see Andrew waving a large sign at him from around 50 feet away at the end of his run, causes the experts to seriously question whether Jason should be driving at all. Siham quickly loses her composure after hitting the first arch and hits two more and misses one. Ian manages to get through most of the arches, but ruins an otherwise-decent run by smashing the third arch. 
Best Performer: George was the only driver not to hit any of the arches, but was heavily criticized for taking the run 15 km/h too fast.
Worst Performer: Chanie and Jason; Chanie smashed more arches than any other driver, while Jason destroyed almost as many arches and took out a camera as well.
After the Eye of the Needle, the experts confront Ian about the list he gave Andrew prior to the Riding the Rails Challenge, noting that the issues he listed indicate that he is someone who until now simply wasn't prepared to put in the effort required to be a good driver, rather than suffering from any technical issues; Ian in turn admits that he has decided to give up being a taxi driver and that the only reason he was even doing the job was to fund the journalism degree that he's currently undertaking. George is the only driver who actively wants to graduate, while the others all admit that they still need a lot of work before they can even consider graduating. The panel are split, with Andrew and Philippe wanting to graduate George for being technically the most proficient driver, but Cam and Shyamala favouring the notion of graduating Ian, who, despite not passing any challenges, is clearly not the worst of the group and has shown awareness of the issues he needs to address; they also feel that George's arrogant attitude and the possibility of him teaching bad habits to Cody is a deal-breaker, leaving Tim to cast the deciding vote and names Ian becomes the first graduate of the season, surprising nearly all the other drivers. Before Ian drives himself home, Andrew makes him remove the "Taxi" sign from his car and wishes him a successful career in journalism.

Episode 3: What Just Happened?
Original Airdate: November 10, 2014
Distracted Driving: In the first episode, Cam noted that when the series began, DUI was the country's most common motoring offense, but now, distracted driving has taken over as such and since nearly all the drivers in rehab are guilty of somehow being distracted at the wheel on a regular basis (Tyler eats, drinks and smokes while at the wheel, Jason reads newspapers and everyone else uses their cellphone while driving; Siham is the only one who consistently refuses to be distracted at the wheel and, as such, is exempted from this challenge), the remaining drivers are each asked to drive a simple course in a Ford Mustang coupe while undertaking the task that causes them to be distracted. Santana causes a lot of damage to the course even while sending simple texts. Tyler does even more damage while drinking from a bottle of soda and compounds the situation by losing the lid and spending time looking for it instead of looking where he's going; after his run ends, he admits that eating, drinking or smoking while flying a plane is punishable by instant revocation of a pilot's license. Chanie causes a lot of damage to the course just finding her cellphone, before a dramatic accident happens when she actually takes a selfie, as the car runs over some foam obstacles at such high speed that it's launched several feet into the air and nearly flips over; while the crew did not anticipate such an accident, it nonetheless shocks Chanie into emotionally admitting how unsafe her love of selfies at the wheel really is, with her even admitting tearfully that were her son in the car, he could have been killed. Jason's run is much less dramatic, though he still causes a lot of damage both while eating a cupcake and reading from a drivers' handbook. George is asked to call his fiancée, Michelle, during his run and she speaks to Andrew over the speakerphone, revealing just how much she's been trying to break his habits; he claims that he's now reformed, but neither Michelle, Patrik nor Andrew believe him for a minute. Mariah doesn't take the challenge seriously and laughs throughout the destruction she causes while simultaneously eating and driving; it's then revealed that Shyamala had a lengthy talk with Mariah the previous day and concluded that she has a tendency towards self-destructive behaviour due to a severe lack of self-worth, which in turn appears to have roots in the fact that in 2004, when she was 12, Mariah's father abandoned her family.
Reverse Figure-Eight: In another frequent challenge, the drivers are each placed at the wheel of a second-generation Dodge Ram Campervan covered with a huge number of signalling lights, and tasked with reversing around a course shaped like a figure-eight, with the other drivers as their passengers. Mariah quickly sets off without bothering to adjust her mirrors-- and doesn't even use them anyway-- and ends up hitting 13 objects, with her run doubly deemed a failure because she again didn't make a serious effort. Chanie ends up hitting 32 objects due to her inability to understand front-end swing. Tyler puts the other drivers at ease with a mock preflight announcement, but like Chanie, he doesn't understand how to counteract the front-end swing, leading to a similarly poor run in which he hits 25 objects. George hits an object early on (earning himself another punch from Patrik and one from Andrew for good measure), but quickly gets it together and doesn't hit another thing during his run, which he finishes even faster than Andrew did in his demonstration. Santana fails to adjust or use her mirrors early on, but picks up the technique and doesn't hit anything after the first corner. Before Jason's run, it's revealed that he was sent for an eye examination the previous day, which found that his bad eyesight is caused by a combination of early-stage glaucoma and some nerve damage caused by excess pressure on his eyeballs. In fact, his eyesight is so bad that the attending optometrist says he is obligated to contact the Ministry of Transportation with this information, which may lead to Jason's driving license being put up for review. In the meantime, Jason takes the challenge, but even with his new glasses, he hits 17 things; a poor performance, but one he admits would have been far worse without the glasses. Siham has the final run and her extreme anxiety causes her to give up after the first corner. Andrew therefore takes her for a private lesson elsewhere in the rehab centre, teaching her proper mirror usage.
Best Performer: George and Santana, who both finished quickly and with minimal hits.
Worst Performer: Siham, who gave up almost immediately; of the remaining drivers who completed the challenge, Chanie had the highest number of hits, with 32.
Cadillac Challenge: The Shoulder-Check Challenge: After the drivers each get a lesson from Philippe in proper driving posture, they are each tasked with driving up a lane at a fixed 70 km/h and then shoulder-checking two towers to see whether they will be required to turn left or right around an obstacle at the end of the lane. Each driver gets two attempts. Siham has the first run and correctly shoulder-checks, but leaves too late to change lanes and hits the obstacle; on her second run, she turns the wheel while shoulder-checking and hits the barriers bordering the lane. Tyler also turns too late in his first run and swerves around erratically on his second, failing both attempts. Mariah passes with ease on her first run. Chanie doesn't even understand what a blind spot is and on her first attempt, she turns the wheel while shoulder-checking, causing her to hit the barrier and the obstacle; on her second run she turns what would otherwise have been a pass into a fail by braking sharply and then gets into an argument with Jeremy, trying to deny that she did so. George fails his first attempt by turning too soon and then fails his second go by turning into the wrong lane, getting more punches from Patrik and Andrew as a result. The experts are hopeful that Jason's glasses will help him greatly in this challenge, but these hopes quickly evaporate when he turns the wheel while shoulder-checking and consequently clips the barrier, along with failing to even drive at the required speed. On his second run, however, Jason passes with ease, much to his and Bart's joy. Santana has the final run and performs flawlessly, passing on the first attempt. 
Best Performer: Mariah and Santana, who both passed flawlessly on their first attempts.
Worst Performer: While no one else passed, Siham and Tyler were the worst as they failed both of their attempts; Chanie also failed both attempts, but only narrowly on the second run.
Most of the drivers tell the experts without any hesitation that they will never drive while distracted again and Jason also reveals that he's going to wear his glasses full-time from now on. However, while Mariah vows never to drink-drive again, she won't commit to also giving up the use of her phone while driving. The biggest concern is Siham's defeatist attitude, as she openly admits that she isn't overly concerned whether or not she continues to drive and refuses to commit to making herself a better driver. Every one of the experts has a different opinion on who should leave rehab; Tim is in favour of expelling Siham for showing no desire to learn (which would have made her the second contestant in the show's history to be expelled by the experts for showing no desire to learn after Colin Sheppard from the second season), Shyamala doesn't feel anyone should graduate, Philippe feels that now that Jason has glasses, it's safe to return him to the roads, Cam says that George is the most technically skilled and should be given the graduation he missed out on last episode, while Andrew wants to graduate Santana for showing the best attitude and passing both challenges this episode. Andrew is eventually able to convince the other judges to back his fellow Newfie and Santana becomes the second graduate of the season.

Note: This episode did not display an opening title screen or broadcast the opening animation.

Episode 4: Piece of Cake
Original Airdate: November 17, 2014
The Speed Perception Challenge: In a brand-new challenge, the drivers are each put at the wheel of a decommissioned police cruiser, which has its instrument panel hidden behind a plastic shield (though a camera points behind the shield to show the crew the speedometer). They are then tasked with taking two runs—one where they drive in a straight line to 50 km/h and a second where they're asked to drive to 70 km/h and then brake sharply before hitting a "wall" made up of foam boxes. The difficulty of this challenge is demonstrated when Andrew fails his demonstration, driving at 75 km/h on the second part and hitting the boxes, though not hard enough to knock them over. Mariah has the first run, and despite her own admissions of habitual speeding is too slow in her first run, driving at just 38 km/h. She drives at almost exactly 70 km/h on the second part, but brakes too late and runs into the wall, failing the challenge. Tyler performs identically to Mariah on the first run, but Jason drives far too fast at 65 km/h. Chanie also drives too fast on her second run (80 km/h) and brakes far too late, resulting in her completely demolishing the wall and stopping several car lengths too far. Siham technically succeeds in the second part of the challenge, but her run is deemed a failure because Wayne was directing her speed throughout. George also drives too fast on his second run and despite braking almost perfectly, still runs through the wall. It's then shown that during a meeting with Shyamala the previous day, George admitted being worried that he would pass his speeding habits on to his 16-year-old son, Cody, to which Shayamala told him to be firm in ensuring that Cody doesn't break the law, but also to acknowledge that he will make mistakes as he learns. On top of that, it's revealed that Cody was secretly brought to the rehab centre two days prior and has been watching footage of George's challenge performances, along with getting private lessons from Tim.
The Water-Tank Challenge: For this annual challenge, the drivers must navigate an early 1990s Volvo station wagon with a roof-mounted  water tank (specially reinforced to prevent a recurrence of the incident from the previous season when Canada's Worst Driver 3 "runner-up" Shelby D'Souza accidentally broke the tank midway through his run and lost  of water) through a course designed to test their ability to drive smoothly. Andrew has another rocky demonstration, getting soaked three times, but only losing  of water. Tyler has the first run and loses large amounts of water on every part of the course, along with knocking down a foam person in the final slalom; he sets the bar extremely low, losing . While George only loses  (the smallest amount other than Andrew), his braking and acceleration are erratic throughout the challenge and the experts remain unimpressed by his attitude toward the challenges. Jason loses over half the water on the opening straight alone due to jerky acceleration and sharp braking and bizarrely decides to remove his new glasses halfway through the challenge, making things even worse, as he loses . Siham also drives erratically throughout and the experts note that Wayne's well-intentioned, but poor, advice is becoming as much of a problem as Siham's own lack of self-confidence; she loses . Mariah loses  of water after a run so bad that most of it doesn't even get shown after she lets go of the steering wheel during the initial straight. Amazingly, Chanie loses exactly the same amount of water due to repeated sharp braking.
Best Performer: Even though everyone drove jerkily, George lost far less water than any other driver.
Worst Performer: Chanie and Mariah, who both lost almost all of the water in the tank.
Cadillac Challenge: Swerve and Avoid: In what is regarded one of the show's most important challenges due to its potential to save lives, each driver has to drive down a straight section at 70 km/h, toward two openings. An oversized foam birthday cake will then appear in one of the openings and the driver must steer the car into the other opening, with looking where they want to go an important element of the challenge. Chanie, who still insists on wearing wedges despite Andrew's pleas to the contrary, fails her first attempt disastrously, failing to look where she wants to go, stomping on the brakes, locking them up, then skidding directly into the lane that the cake appeared in, badly damaging the Cadillac's front bumper. On her second attempt, however, she manages to steer into the correct lane, passing her first challenge. Before George's run, more footage of Tim's private lessons with Cody is shown and Cody is quickly becoming aware of the faults in his father's (and his own) techniques. When he takes his run, George drives at 80 km/h, but still successfully passes the challenge. Siham fails her first run by initially steering toward the cake and failing to correct her in time, with Wayne's continued chatter only making things worse. Adding insult to injury, the Cadillac's front bumper, which had already been badly damaged in Chanie's first run, detaches itself from the car. Jason fails his first attempt when he looks at and steers directly into the cake, but passes on his second go after Andrew reminds him to look where he wants to go. In a break from his usual habits, Tyler actually drives too fast (at 90 km/h) and fails his first run by steering directly into the cake. He drives at the right speed on his second run, but again drives straight into the cake; this leaves Tyler as the only remaining driver not to have passed a single challenge so far. On Mariah's first run, she fixates on the wall dividing the two exits, never sees the cake and smashes directly through the wall. Despite Jessica pointing out that she saw the cake with plenty of time to spare, Mariah refuses to acknowledge that it ever popped out; because of her refusal to take responsibility for her error, she is barred from taking her second run. 
Best Performer: George was the only driver to pass... and on his first attempt, no less.
Worst Performer: Mariah, whose attitude got the challenge halted after her first run. Of the drivers who did get two runs, Tyler performed the worst, steering right at the cake both times.
After the Swerve and Avoid, George is finally told that Cody has been brought to rehab and he takes George and Andrew on a quick drive through the surrounding area to demonstrate that, if anything, Cody is now an even better driver than his father. During this drive, George admits that he was a terrible teacher and is proud of his son. While Jason feels that he deserves to graduate, the experts quickly agree that George, having already been passed over twice on the grounds that his arrogant attitude and the possibility of him teaching bad habits to Cody was a deal-breaker and Santana showed the best attitude in the previous episode, is the overwhelmingly obvious choice to graduate for performing the best in all three challenges this episode; the clear improvement in his attitude and the experts no longer needing to worry about him passing on bad habits to Cody helps seal the decision and George becomes the third graduate.

Episode 5: 1 - 2 - 3 - Go!
Original Airdate: November 24, 2014
Airbag Safety: Before the first challenge, Andrew gives the remaining five drivers a brief safety lesson on the dangers that can be caused by the violent inflation of an airbag, as nearly all of them have bad habits that could cause them to be injured (Mariah's constant smartphone use, Tyler's habit of hunching over his wheel, Jason's incorrect wheel grip and Chanie's bizarre driving posture; Siham is again the only driver with no major issues in this department, having been in a four-car pileup in 2010). The triggering of a Honda Civic's passenger-side airbag is shown to be so violent that it blows the rear-view mirror into the car's backseat, shocking all the drivers.
School Bus Three-Point Turn: While challenges involving a three-point turn are commonplace for the show, the task is much harder this year, as the drivers each have to drive a school bus (which Andrew adds is being used to give the drivers a lesson in front-end swing) into a large turning space bordered by cars and make a three-point turn without hitting anything. Each driver has 40 minutes in which to complete the challenge. Chanie, who didn't even know what a three-point turn was until a few days ago, initially doesn't use her mirrors and makes no effort to avoid hitting the cars. Andrew draws her a map to illustrate how to do the challenge and she completes it on her next turn. Tyler also didn't know what a three-point turn was, but he manages to carry it out on his first turn without Andrew even needing to explain it, finally passing his first challenge of the season. Jason fails all of his first three runs within seconds, as the front-end swing causes him to hit the barriers leading into the turning space. He fails after running out of time, though is able to work out how to do it after the fact. Siham technically succeeds on her first go, but it isn't considered a true pass since Wayne directed her throughout. Mariah ends up using the entire 40 minutes on her first attempt alone, as her overly-tight turning causes her to get stuck and her inability to get out causes her to fail. However, Andrew teaches her how to do the three-point turn after the challenge has officially ended.
Best Performer: Tyler and Siham were the only ones to pass this challenge, with Tyler doing slightly better because Siham relied heavily on Wayne's advice during her run.
Worst Performer: Even though no one else passed, Mariah was the worst for using up the entire allotted 40 minutes just making one attempt.
Forward Handbrake J-Turn: In what is noted to be one of the show's harder challenges, the drivers must each drive a Ford Mustang coupe into a small turning space at 50 km/h and use the handbrake to spin the car around 180° while dodging an oversized foam birthday cake, before safely driving out of the space. Each driver has three chances to succeed. In his first turn, Jason somehow forgets that he's supposed to use the handbrake and hits the far wall with the car still entirely facing forwards. He makes a similar mistake (using the footbrake) on his second turn and his inability to even comprehend the difference between how a footbrake and a handbrake works causes the experts to again question Jason's suitability to drive at all. He finally gets the technique somewhat correct on his third attempt, but carries it out too late and hits a side wall, failing. Tyler relies on Q to read out his speed during his first two attempts and he fails his first attempt when he uses the footbrake. His second attempt goes better, but only spins the car by about 140°. His final attempt is taken too fast at 60 km/h, but he still carries out the technique correctly; Andrew tells him that his speeding would normally cause this to be deemed a failure, but agrees to call it a pass since he did it without Q's help. Chanie appears to pass the challenge on her first attempt, but the experts and Andrew refuse to consider it a pass, as she pulled the handbrake early and missed the cake by just inches. She's forced to take her second run and becomes unresponsive, forcing Jeremy to pull the handbrake for her. Jeremy is asked to sit out Chanie's third run and she finally passes the challenge. Wayne asks to sit out Siham's run, afraid that the challenge would trigger his motion sickness and Andrew is all too happy to take his place in the car, as it will force Siham to think for herself. Unfortunately, this does not lead to Andrew's hoped-for result and she posts the worst performance of the day, smashing through the outer walls on all three attempts, causing Andrew to realize that her self-confidence is even lower than he-- and Shyamala, for that matter-- previously thought it was. Mariah's run is less dramatic, but she fails all three attempts due to her using the footbrake instead of the handbrake.
Best Performer: Chanie and Tyler were the only ones to pass this challenge, with both needing all three attempts.
Worst Performer: Even though no one else passed, Siham was the worst, as she crashed through the turning area's outer walls on each attempt.
Cadillac Challenge: The Reverse Flick: In an attempt to take advantage of the previous lesson still being fresh in the heads of the drivers, the show's other car-spinning challenge is the next one to be held. This time the drivers have to reverse into a turning space at 40 km/h and again spin the car around 180°, with the number of chances also being three. Due to Andrew only narrowly passing his demonstration, the course is widened to make life easier for the others. Jason again gets the first run and fails all three attempts; on his first go, he leaves far too late to steer and on his other two attempts, he doesn't even get into the turning space, crashing through the barriers that make up the entry lane. Mariah also smashes the entry barriers on her first attempt due to not looking where she wants to go, but passes on her second attempt after she focuses properly. On his first attempt, Tyler hits the entry barriers; he fails his second attempt due to driving too fast (at 60 km/h) and turning too late and his third attempt ends in failure for largely the same reason, along with Q still telling him what to do. A clearly unenthusiastic Siham becomes the third driver in a row to hit the barriers in her first run and take it a step further by not even bothering to stop and smashing one of the turning area's walls. Before she takes another run, Siham gets a private lesson from Andrew, in which her erratic driving ends up triggering Wayne's motion sickness. She then takes her second run with Andrew as her passenger and passes. Chanie has the final run and after drastically failing her first run by smashing the entry barriers at high speed, she admits to having no reversing experience whatsoever before being on the show. On her second run however, she passes with ease. 
Best Performer: Chanie, Mariah and Siham, who all passed on their second attempts.
Worst Performer: Jason and Tyler, who failed the challenge entirely.
While Chanie is noted to be the obvious front-runner to graduate, as she passed every challenge, she admits not fully comprehend all the challenges and that she should stay in rehab for the time being. Siham and Tyler, who both passed two challenges, also say they don't want to graduate. Mariah and Jason, who passed one challenge and no challenges respectively, aren't even considered for graduation. Cam and Philippe nominate Chanie to graduate, as she was statistically the best driver this episode, though Cam isn't overly enthusiastic about letting her go. Shyamala and Tim, on the other hand, feel that Siham is the person who deserves to graduate, as they consider her the most technically adept of the five remaining drivers, despite her confidence issues. This leaves Andrew to cast the deciding vote, but elects not to back Chanie or Siham, as he feels they are both still lacking in focus and confidence, respectively. In what Andrew notes has become something of an annual tradition for the show, the season's fifth episode ends with no one graduating.

Web Extra: Road Signs: As is often done on the show, each of the drivers was given a brief test by Tim on their road sign awareness. Siham and Tyler post the joint-highest scores (their total is not revealed), while Chanie posts the worst score, getting just 3/10 and although she correctly identifies a "yield" sign, Chanie admits to having no idea what she's actually supposed to do when she sees one when driving.

Episode 6: Know Your Limits
Original Airdate: December 1, 2014
Canada's Worst Parking Lot: All the drivers admit to having caused at least one accident while in a parking lot (even Siham, who is regarded as the best-behaved of the drivers, once broke her driving-side mirror), leading to this semi-regular challenge being held. Each driver has a different car and is required to reverse into a parking spot when it opens up; furthermore, each driver is permitted no more than three or four turns while parking. Mariah and Siham quickly get into parking spots, but fail for taking too long to do it. Chanie (who is disadvantaged by having by far the largest vehicle) reverses into a marked "parent with child" spot and then smashes the sign, while Jason hits a bus and then illegally parks in a disabled spot, a mistake which Mariah then also makes. It then turns out that Mariah is severely ignorant about parking laws, which she denies even exist. Tyler becomes the first person to park, doing so without any trouble, while Chanie fails another two attempts due to hitting another car and poorly aligned parking respectively. Siham then passes, with Mariah also passing shortly after that, though their techniques are far from perfect. After more and more failed attempts from Chanie and Jason, Andrew calls a halt to the challenge and declares that they have both failed.
Best Driver: Tyler was the first to get parked up and without any real difficulty.
Worst Performer: Chanie and Jason both failed to get parked up at all.
Parallel Parking: Due to the generally poor performances in the last challenge, a full parallel parking challenge is held next, with Tim giving each driver extensive lessons in how to park without hitting anyone or anything. Each driver has ten attempts in the decommissioned police cruiser. Siham is first-up and passes without making a single mistake. Mariah also passes, but takes six attempts. Despite being the best performer in the previous challenge, Tyler completely forgets the lesson and never even comes close to parking up correctly, failing all ten attempts. Jason remembers the lesson and passes on his fifth attempt. Chanie's performance is by far the worst, as she hits more things on her first run alone than all the other drivers combined... and not surprisingly, is oblivious to having hit anything at all, leaving Andrew increasingly convinced that Chanie should quit driving and she doesn't have it in her to be a better driver. Like Tyler, all ten of her runs end in failure.
Best Performer: Siham, who passed on her first attempt without difficulty.
Worst Performer: Chanie and Tyler, since all ten of their runs ended in failure, although Tyler was more attentive during his attempts.
Cadillac Challenge: The Slalom: In a variation on the third part of the initial skills test, each driver has to first slalom around five foam people at 80 km/h, then move the people closer together to the shortest distance they feel safe steering around. Jason can't even complete the initial run, but still insists on a totally unrealistic  reduction in the distance between each figure; unsurprisingly, he fails by smashing two of the figures and then ends up in the adjoining field. Siham easily completes the first section and also completes a course with a  figure distance reduction, causing Andrew to confidently predict that Siham will graduate this episode. Mariah passes the first section just as easily as Siham and, to Andrew's shock, performs equally well in the second section despite an ambitious  reduction, causing Andrew to admit that what looked like a near-certain graduation for Siham now looks like being a toss-up between her and Mariah. Chanie relies on Jeremy to watch her speed and posts a thoroughly dismal performance on her first run. She elects to take her second run with the figures spaced the same distance apart, but she closes her eyes during the run, which ends up being just as bad as the first one and also smashes off the Cadillacs' rear bumper. Tyler has the final run and his first attempt is just as bad as Chanie's corresponding run, in large part because he fails to grip the steering wheel correctly. Shockingly, Tyler insists on the same  reduction that Mariah had and his second attempt not only results in him smashing the same number of foam people as in his first run, he locks up the brakes and spins completely out of control. After the challenge, Andrew, Q and Tyler believe based on his performance, Tyler might end up getting the title. 
Best Performer: Mariah and Siham; though Mariah managed a greater reduction between the figures than Siham, both were considered equally aware of their limitations.
Worst Performer: Even though Chanie relied on Jeremy to watch her speed on her first run and closed her eyes on her second and Tyler smashed the same number of foam people in both of his runs, Jason was the worst for asking for an even more unrealistic distance reduction than Tyler did.
Mariah and Siham are easily agreed on as the only two possible nominees, as they both passed every challenge this episode and want to graduate. Jason half-heartedly puts himself forward to graduate and is immediately shot down, while Tyler and a tearful Chanie admit that they both need a lot more work. Tim and Shyamala back Mariah to graduate, with Tim feeling that she has superior technical skills and more confidence compared to Siham, something which he feels is particularly obvious in the lessons he's been giving drivers in-between episodes and Shyamala convinced that Mariah has drastically reformed her attitude. However, Philippe and Cam back Siham to graduate for performing better than Mariah in all the challenges, once again leaving Andrew with the deciding vote and chooses Mariah as the next graduate. Before she leaves the Driver Rehabilitation Centre, however, Mariah gets a tattoo on her left forearm, to specifically remind her never to drink-drive again (Mariah appears in a bonus clip of Canada's Worst Driver 12 in an attempt by Andrew to reform eventual "winner" Krystal McCann from texting and driving prior to Krystal's final drive).

Web Extra: Parallel Parking, Cont'd: Extra footage of the drivers' attempts at the parallel parking challenge is shown. Siham admits gaining a lot of confidence after her practically flawless performance; Mariah complains that parking spaces should be bigger; Chanie optimistically asks Jeremy whether he'd trust her parallel parking his truck, which he immediately answers in the negative; Tyler admits that he didn't carry out a single part of the challenge correctly and is ashamed of his performance; Jason says that he's "won the battle, but not the war."

Episode 7: Slip and Slide
Original Airdate: December 8, 2014
The Longest Reversing Challenge Ever: This challenge, which has been held annually since the eighth season, has the drivers reversing a 1993-model Mustang through a 1 kilometre-long course bordered by wheel rims, cars, concrete blocks and foam obstacles. While each driver is allowed to take the challenge at their own pace, Andrew emphasizes that the challenge is timed and says that ideally, each driver should be travelling at 50 km/h by the latter, wider stages of the course. Tyler is first-up and gets off to a good start, managing not to knock any wheel rims down, but his run quickly falls apart as he repeatedly hits and scrapes the car and smashes both of the wing mirrors. After his run ends, Tyler admits that he missed the point of the challenge and was focused on completing his run as soon as possible rather than as safely as possible. Chanie gets off to a much more dreadful start than Tyler, relying entirely not on Jeremy, for once, but on her wing mirrors to reverse and steering very erratically, resulting in her knocking down nearly half the wheel rims in the opening section. She goes far slower than Tyler and still hits far more things, causing the other experts to check with Tim as to whether he actually did teach her how to reverse. She ends up hitting 32 objects in all. Jason's run is just as bad as Chanie's in the early sections, if not worse, despite actually trying to use the correct technique. He does get it together in the latter, wider parts, where he only hits a few objects, but this only frustrates Bart, who points out that while Jason can be competent, he sorely needs to focus more. Before Siham starts, Andrew predicts that she will have easily the best run, a prediction which falls apart in mere seconds as she constantly veers to the right and very rarely looks out the back window, before speeding up to 80 km/h and eventually spinning violently out of the course, meaning that hers actually ends up being the worst performance in this challenge.
Best Performer: Tyler; while his performance was poor (and Lord knows how poor Tyler's performance was), he still hit fewer things than anyone else.
Worst Performer: Even though no one else passed, Siham was the worst for driving at a dangerously fast speed and losing control of the car.
The Cross: Before this challenge, a brief clip is shown of Andrew introducing the challenge in previous seasons and former Canada's Worst Driver "winners" Jason Zhang, Ashley van Ham, Lance Morin, Shirley Sampson and Kevin Simmons all attempting this challenge (and eventually failing) in their respective seasons. This year, the challenge requires them to turn around the Dodge Ram Campervan (which is still covered in signal lights) in a small cross-shaped course made up from concrete barriers. Jason gets the first run and Bart is surprised and impressed by his performance, which sees him complete the challenge in 21 minutes with no major hits at all. Tyler, meanwhile hits the van eight times just making the first 90° turn. Things only get worse from there and he ends up smashing off many of the lights along with the van's left-hand strengthening bar; it ultimately takes him 29 minutes to finish the challenge, with a total of 36 hits. Chanie proceeds through the challenge recklessly, without using her mirrors and while she completes it in the fastest time at just 16 minutes, she hits the blocks 46 times. This, along with the fact that she insists that she did well, causes Andrew to say that Chanie simply doesn't seem to have it in her to ever be a good driver and suggest that she give up driving, an idea she angrily rejects. Siham again relies on Wayne to make all the decisions during her run; for once, he actually gives her good advice, but she refuses to follow it and then blames him for the failure of her run, which ends up being better than Tyler's or Chanie's runs, but not by much.
Best Performer: Jason was the only driver not to hit anything during his run.
Worst Performer: Even though no one else passed, Chanie and Tyler were the worst; Chanie for causing more hits than anyone else and Tyler for being the slowest.
The Icy Corner: This was originally supposed to be the episode's Cadillac Challenge, but Andrew reveals that due to damage to the car's electronics, it will no longer start. As a result, the decommissioned police cruiser has been pressed into service for this challenge, which requires the drivers to safely navigate a simulated icy corner at 45 km/h. Each driver gets five attempts. Chanie's first run is a complete disaster, as she drives at nearly 70 km/h, locks up the brakes and doesn't look where she wants to go. She fails her next three runs for exactly the same reasons; on her last run, she finally gets the technique right, but again speeds and brakes too late, resulting in another failure. As a result, Andrew tells Chanie that she will absolutely be in the final episode. Despite Andrew specifically warning Tyler not to speed prior to his first run, he does so anyway (along with not looking where he wants to go) and predictably fails. He nearly gets it right on his second attempt, but fails after repeatedly pumping the brakes, a mistake he repeats on his third and fourth runs. His fifth attempt nearly ends in success, but he brakes just a fraction too late and clips the end of the wall, failing the challenge. Siham relies on Wayne to monitor her speed during her first run; she subsequently speeds and pumps the brakes and the run predictably ends in failure. Andrew angrily remonstrates with her over this and orders Wayne not to direct her, but Siham still fails her next two runs for the same reason as her first and oversteers on her fourth run. Her final run bookends things by again speeding and pumping the brakes, resulting in her failing. Andrew admits his disappointment, as he thought Siham would easily graduate this episode, but her performance has extinguished any realistic hope of that. Jason is the final driver to take the challenge and Andrew reminds him not to speed; unfortunately, Jason does so anyway and locks up the brakes, failing his first run. Jason overcompensates on his second run and stares so intently at the speedometer he forgets to brake at all. He fails his third run by pumping the brake and repeats this mistake on his fourth run, causing Andrew to visibly despair at the prospect of a 100% failure rate in this challenge. Andrew's worst fears come true when Jason fails his final run by braking too late and staring at the wall, meaning that for the first time in the show's history, not one driver succeeded at the Icy Corner. 
Best Performer: Even though no one passed, Tyler was the closest to passing.
Worst Performer: Chanie, Jason and Siham were all the worst, as none of them came anywhere near close to passing the challenge.
The experts face a major quandary, as there was only one clear challenge pass in the entire episode-- Jason's performance in The Cross. Of greater concern, however, is the all-around horrific performances in the Longest Reversing Challenge Ever and Jason effectively destroys his chances of graduation by saying he thought the point of the challenge was to complete it as fast as possible. Chanie also admits to this, though, unlike Jason, concedes that it was clearly the wrong thing to do. Siham shows no awareness of how fast she actually went during the challenge. Tyler also gets called out over his bad performance on that challenge, but does get one bit of good news as he's told that, since his final Icy Corner run was the best in the challenge and would likely avoid most dangerous situations in real-life, they're retroactively upgrading it to a pass, doing Andrew a super favor of reducing the failure rate to 75% and keeping Canada's Worst Driver 10 out of the record books as the first season to ever have the Icy Corner Challenge end in total failure. However, due to the all-around awful performances, Andrew suggests a four-person final (something he previously suggested in the seventh season before ultimately graduating Afiya Lassy), a suggestion that none of the experts take up. Their discussions are not shown, but in the end, Andrew gives Tyler his license back, telling him that, as bad as his performances in the reversing and Icy Corner challenges were, they were still the best of the group. This, along with him having more confidence compared to Siham and being more aware of his mistakes than Jason, results in him becoming the season's penultimate graduate, sending Jason into the finale with Chanie and Siham. Incidentally, this also makes this the first Canada's Worst Driver season where every finalist was shortlisted as a potential graduate at least once.

Episode 8: Icing on the Cake...
Original Airdate: December 15, 2014
The Forward and Reverse Slalom: The finale begins with this challenge, in which each driver has to steer a 1977 Pontiac Parisienne coupe in a slalom around four foam people, in both directions. Each driver has ten runs and must finish the challenge within 45 seconds. Jason (the only male nominee remaining after Tyler graduated last episode) is first to try the challenge and immediately manages the forward section without any trouble, but has major difficulty on the reverse section, going too slow and turning far too wide. However, his runs gradually improve and he ultimately becomes the only contestant to pass, doing so on his eighth attempt. Siham gets off to the worst possible start, hitting the very first foam person in her forward run; on her second run, she smashes several of the foam people while reversing and even destroys the foam arch that serves as the challenge's starting point. Her runs get successively worse, including her leaving the track entirely on at least two separate occasions and she ultimately fails all ten attempts. After this, she re-iterates the promise she made when she arrived at rehab-- that she will destroy her driving license if named Canada's Worst Driver. Chanie optimistically predicts that she will pass the challenge in one attempt; unsurprisingly, she doesn't and smashes a foam person in her forwards run. After a similarly poor second run, she nearly passes her third run, but ruins it by hitting the starting arch. Chanie then asks Andrew if he'll upgrade the challenge to a pass in exchange for a hug, but Andrew berates her for this, telling her that she cannot emotionally bribe people into overlooking her driving problems. The next three runs turn out to be poor ones and the three after that are again near-passes all ruined by her hitting the arch. She finally has a near-perfect drive on her final attempt, but fails as she was just two seconds too slow. Chanie is severely upset by this to the point she starts to cry, but in a classic example of what a good boyfriend should be, Jeremy consoles her with the fact that Siham was far, far, far worse.
Best Performer: Jason, who had the only pass on his eighth attempt.
Worst Performer: Even though Chanie and Siham both failed this challenge, Siham was the worst for not even coming anywhere near close to passing on any of her runs.
The Mega-Challenge: With all attempts to repair the Cadillac having failed, the Mustang is called into service for this year's final challenge. The course layout is virtually identical to the previous year, beginning with an Eye of the Needle/Slalom combo taken at 60 km/h, then a precision drive through wheel rims in both directions, during which the car must be turned around in a tight section of concrete blocks. After leaving the wheel rims, the car has to be turned around with a reverse flick and finally negotiated through an icy corner. Chanie is first-up and successfully gets through all the Eye of the Needle arches, but hits all the foam people between them. She drives quickly and recklessly through the precision steering section in both directions, along with hitting the car several times while turning it around and then bizarrely decides to take a break to do her make-up in before attempting the reverse flick, which she admits she has no idea how to actually carry out. Andrew has to get in the car with her and remind her of the lesson, but when she attempts it she veers to the right and hits the wall bordering the course, a performance that she still thinks was "okay." She then fails the icy corner by taking it far too fast. Despite her overall terrible performance, she angrily denies that she will be Canada's Worst Driver and, when asked by Andrew who is, says that Siham will. Jason is next and gets off to a perfect start by getting through the opening Eye of the Needle and Slalom perfectly and not hitting anything in the forward part of the precision steering section. However, things quickly go wrong when turning the car around and he causes even more damage to the car than Chanie did. His reverse flick also proves to be worse than Chanie's corresponding attempt and while he doesn't speed as much as she did on the icy corner, he still goes too fast and ends up failing. His overall performance is much better than Chanie's, but Andrew feels he's still in denial about his major issues. Siham also gets off to a flawless start, though Wayne continues to micro-manage her driving; as a result of this, Andrew orders him out of the car before the precision steering section, which Siham then drives through without making a real effort to avoid the wheel rims. The rest of her run is effectively a carbon-copy of Jason's, as she fails the reverse flick and icy corner in exactly the same manner that he did, leaving her overall performance worse than his, but a little better than Chanie's.
Best Performer: Jason, who passed everything up to and including the first precision steering section.
Worst Performer: Chanie, who didn't successfully complete one section of the challenge.
 Road Test: The road test is conducted on the streets of Hamilton, Ontario (the location of the show's decisive drive since Canada's Worst Driver 7), this time in a Ford Thunderbird, with the beginning and ending in front of the Residences of Royal Connaught on King Street East. Jason is first to take the final drive, which is the first time he's driven in a major city with his glasses; unfortunately, they don't prevent him from missing the first turn and his rather unsafe U-turn results in him causing a small traffic jam as he tries to get back on course. Subsequently, he runs red lights and stops at green lights, makes prohibited turns and stops in crosswalks. He gets onto the Chedoke Expressway safely enough, but then makes a huge mistake by slowing down and dropping gear, causing the engine to rev dangerously high before Andrew makes him put it back in the correct gear. He then misses the Aberdeen Avenue turn-off and makes an extremely dangerous lane change to get back on-track. Adding insult to injury, on the way back to the starting point, he parks in two spots designated for use by medical personnel only and then urinates in public behind the Hamilton Early Learning Centre. After this and the 16 moving violations that would cost him $1,865 had he been caught, Andrew predicts that the only way Jason will avoid the title of Canada's Worst Driver is if either Chanie or Siham do worse. Luckily for Jason, Chanie does do worse when she gets off to a bad start by illegally stopping in the very first intersection after exiting the starting point, a mistake she makes again twice in quick succession. She follows this up with a plethora of mistakes, including illegal lane changes, driving in the wrong lane (with a particular trouble in dual-turn lanes, namely the same one, in fact, that Shirley endured during her own final drive three years earlier), making prohibited turns and even driving in a bus lane through a bus terminal (the same one, in fact, that Canada's Worst Driver 8 co-"winner" Flora Wang drove into on her own final drive). As the drive progresses, Andrew notes that whereas Jason simply seemed inattentive in his drive, Chanie seems totally ignorant of the most basic driving laws. While the car is turning onto the highway, Andrew notices that Chanie is once again adopting the bizarre driving postures that she has been repeatedly told not to use; like Jason before her, she proves far too slow on the highway and, unbelievably, makes exactly the same illegal lane change that he did while exiting the highway. When they eventually get back to the starting parking lot, Chanie tries to claim that her drive was good because she "didn't hit anything," causing Andrew to point out that in fact, her drive was even worse than Jason's, with 24 moving violations that would cost her $2,715 had she been caught. Siham has the final drive and, like Jason before her, also misses the first turn; she then deals with her mistake in an even more unsafe manner than Jason did, cutting through a parking lot and ending up driving the wrong way down King William Street (pretty close to where Shirley was during her drive when the officer saw her and gave her a warning). The rest of her drive goes mostly without incident, but she has what turns out to be the worst of the three highway drives, nearly turning off onto the Main Street West exit, then dangerously re-entering the flow of traffic and leaving her indicator light on. On the way back to the parking lot, Andrew has to prevent her from driving into an intersection, which would have caused a collision with another car. She then goes off-course and does a U-turn in the intersection of John Street South and Charlton Avenue East (in front of St. Joseph's Healthcare Hamilton's Charlton) against a red light, committing three moving violations in one go that would cost her a combined $670 had she been caught. In the end, her drive is the best of the three statistically speaking, but she still had 10 moving violations that would cost her $1,450 had she been caught. 
Best Performer: Jason and Siham; Jason committed more moving violations than Siham, but for the most part, they were more careless than dangerous, while Siham committed fewer ticketable offenses than anyone else, but also came alarmingly close to causing a serious accident.
Worst Performer: Chanie, who racked almost as many ticketable offenses as Jason and Siham combined, even with Andrew desperately trying to give her advice.
After the Road Test, the drivers each have their final meeting with the experts. Despite her earlier lackadaisical attitude, Chanie finally shows more awareness of what exactly went wrong as she talks to the experts. However, she then makes a shocking revelation: she's supposed to be on medication for an unspecified condition that causes her lack of focus, but was unable to get a new supply in time for rehab and so has been driving without medication. Andrew tells her that had he known about this beforehand, he would not have allowed her to take her final drive and Cam says that were it proven her failure to take her medication contributed to death by dangerous driving, she could face the same range of punishments as a murder charge. Harsh words are also given to Siham, due to the extremely dangerous mistakes in her highway run and what would likely have been a fatal collision on the four-way intersection; she tries to blame the former mistake on the off-ramp being too short, but admits to learning a lot from rehab. Of the three, Jason is the most willing to admit to his mistakes, but the experts are unconvinced about exactly how much he has learned. For the first time in the show's history, there are effectively three in contention for Canada's Worst Driver due to all three drivers performing badly on the final road test. Shyamala wants Siham to be the final graduate for having the best overall track record of the final three and having what was generally the least eventful road test and advocates naming Chanie and Jason the joint-worst, ultimately giving both a part of that season's trophy), but Cam actually deems Siham to be Canada's Worst Driver, feeling that the mistakes she did make were the ones most likely to result in a fatality than any of the 24 mistakes Chanie committed. Tim deems Chanie the worst for her lack of focus and failure to take responsibility for her actions. Philippe thinks Jason is the worst, pointing out that he ran several red lights and was lucky that this didn't result in any accidents. With the panel completely deadlocked and unable to even agree who should be the final graduate, let alone the worst, the decision on the final three's rankings ends up once again falling to Andrew.

When the three drivers assemble for the trophy presentation, Andrew announces that, even though he still has some way to go, Jason is not Canada's Worst Driver, but instead the season's final graduate, as he showed the most improvement of the final three, had the best performance on the two final Rehab Centre challenges and at least wasn't overwhelmingly worse than Siham or Chanie on the final drive. This, therefore, leaves Chanie and Siham as the final two and in the end, Chanie is named Canada's Worst Driver due to the fact that she ultimately did not appear to have learned anything from her time on the show (aside from not to drive distracted) and showed no real improvement in her driving skill, but most of all because she showed a reckless disregard for safety by not telling anyone she was supposed to be on medication. While Siham does not technically graduate, Andrew notes that she did improve a lot in rehab and believes that she will ultimately become a good driver again someday. Despite her desperate pleas, Andrew shocks Chanie by appearing to cut up her driving license, but reveals that what he actually destroyed was a duplicate license she gave him on the first day of rehab, which legally she's not permitted to have, as it is invalid. He then gives Chanie the trophy and her actual license back before Jeremy drives her away as the tenth person (sixth woman) to be awarded the trophy.

References

External links
 
 

10
2014 Canadian television seasons